In mathematics, a quadric or quadric hypersurface is the subspace of N-dimensional space defined by a polynomial equation of degree 2 over a field. Quadrics are fundamental examples in algebraic geometry. The theory is simplified by working in projective space rather than affine space. An example is the quadric surface

in projective space  over the complex numbers C. A quadric has a natural action of the orthogonal group, and so the study of quadrics can be considered as a descendant of Euclidean geometry.

Many properties of quadrics hold more generally for projective homogeneous varieties. Another generalization of quadrics is provided by Fano varieties.

Basic properties
By definition, a quadric X of dimension n over a field k is the subspace of  defined by q = 0, where q is a nonzero homogeneous polynomial of degree 2 over k in variables . (A homogeneous polynomial is also called a form, and so q may be called a quadratic form.) If q is the product of two linear forms, then X is the union of two hyperplanes. It is common to assume that  and q is irreducible, which excludes that special case.

Here algebraic varieties over a field k are considered as a special class of schemes over k. When k is algebraically closed, one can also think of a projective variety in a more elementary way, as a subset of  defined by homogeneous polynomial equations with coefficients in k.

If q can be written (after some linear change of coordinates) as a polynomial in a proper subset of the variables, then X is the projective cone over a lower-dimensional quadric. It is reasonable to focus attention on the case where X is not a cone. For k of characteristic not 2, X is not a cone if and only if X is smooth over k. When k has characteristic not 2, smoothness of a quadric is also equivalent to the Hessian matrix of q having nonzero determinant, or to the associated bilinear form b(x,y) = q(x+y) – q(x) – q(y) being nondegenerate. In general, for k of characteristic not 2, the rank of a quadric means the rank of the Hessian matrix. A quadric of rank r is an iterated cone over a smooth quadric of dimension r − 2.

It is a fundamental result that a smooth quadric over a field k is rational over k if and only if X has a k-rational point. For example, if k is infinite, it follows that if X has one k-rational point then it has infinitely many. This equivalence is proved by stereographic projection. In particular, every quadric over an algebraically closed field is rational.

A quadric over a field k is called isotropic if it has a k-rational point. An example of an anisotropic quadric is the quadric

in projective space  over the real numbers R.

Linear subspaces of quadrics
A central part of the geometry of quadrics is the study of the linear spaces that they contain. A key point is that every linear space contained in a smooth quadric has dimension at most half the dimension of the quadric. Moreover, when k is algebraically closed, this is an optimal bound, meaning that every smooth quadric of dimension n over k contains a linear subspace of dimension .

Over any field k, a smooth quadric of dimension n is called split if it contains a linear space of dimension  over k. Thus every smooth quadric over an algebraically closed field is split. If a quadric X over a field k  is split, then it can be written (after a linear change of coordinates) as

if X has dimension 2m − 1, or

if X has dimension 2m. In particular, over an algebraically closed field, there is only one smooth quadric of each dimension, up to isomorphism.

For many applications, it is important to describe the space Y of all linear subspaces of maximal dimension in a given smooth quadric X. (For clarity, assume that X is split over k.) A striking phenomenon is that Y is connected if X has odd dimension, whereas it has two connected components if X has even dimension. That is, there are two different "types" of maximal linear spaces in X when X has even dimension.
The two families can be described by: for a smooth quadric X of dimension 2m, fix one m-plane Q contained in X. Then the two types of m-planes P contained in X are distinguished by whether the dimension of the intersection  is even or odd. (The dimension of the empty set is taken to be −1 here.)

Low-dimensional quadrics
Let X be a split quadric over a field k. (In particular, X can be any smooth quadric over an algebraically closed field.) In low dimensions, X and the linear spaces it contains can be described as follows.

 A split quadric 3-fold X can be viewed as an isotropic Grassmannian for the symplectic group Sp(4,k). Namely, given a 4-dimensional vector space V with a symplectic form, the quadric 3-fold X can be identified with the space LGr(2,4) of 2-planes in V on which the form restricts to zero.

 A split quadric 4-fold X can be viewed as the Grassmannian Gr(2,4), the space of 2-planes in a 4-dimensional vector space (or equivalently, of lines in ).

 The space of 2-planes in a split quadric 5-fold is isomorphic to a split quadric 6-fold. Likewise, both components of the space of 3-planes in a split quadric 6-fold are isomorphic to a split quadric 6-fold. (This is related to the phenomenon of triality for the group Spin(8).)

As these examples suggest, the space of m-planes in a split quadric of dimension 2m always has two connected components, each isomorphic to the isotropic Grassmannian of (m − 1)-planes in a split quadric of dimension 2m − 1. Any reflection in the orthogonal group maps one component isomorphically to the other.

The Bruhat decomposition
A smooth quadric over a field k is a projective homogeneous variety for the orthogonal group (and for the special orthogonal group), viewed as linear algebraic groups over k. Like any projective homogeneous variety for a split reductive group, a split quadric X has an algebraic cell decomposition, known as the Bruhat decomposition. (In particular, this applies to every smooth quadric over an algebraically closed field.) That is, X can be written as a finite union of disjoint subsets that are isomorphic to affine spaces over k of various dimensions. (For projective homogeneous varieties, the cells are called Schubert cells, and their closures are called Schubert varieties.) Cellular varieties are very special among all algebraic varieties. For a cellular variety, the Chow group of algebraic cycles on X is the free abelian group on the set of cells, as is the integral homology of X (if k = C).

A split quadric X of dimension n has only one cell of each dimension r, except in the middle dimension of an even-dimensional quadric, where there are two cells. The corresponding cell closures (Schubert varieties) are:

 For , a linear space  contained in X.

 For r = n/2, both Schubert varieties are linear spaces  contained in X, one from each of the two families of middle-dimensional linear spaces (as described above).

It is the iterated cone over a smooth quadric of dimension 2r − n.

Using the Bruhat decomposition, it is straightforward to compute the Chow ring of a split quadric of dimension n over a field, as follows. (The cohomology in odd degrees is zero.)

 For n = 2m − 1, where |h| = 1 and |l| = m.

 For n = 2m, where |h| = 1 and |l| = m, and a is 0 for m odd and 1 for m even.

This calculation shows the importance of the linear subspaces of a quadric: the Chow ring of all algebraic cycles on X is generated by the "obvious" element h (pulled back from the class  of a hyperplane in ) together with the class of a maximal linear subspace of X.

Isotropic Grassmannians and the spinor variety
The space of r-planes in a smooth n-dimensional quadric (like the quadric itself) is a projective homogeneous variety, known as the isotropic Grassmannian or orthogonal Grassmannian OGr(r + 1, n + 2). (The numbering refers to the dimensions of the corresponding vector spaces. In the case of middle-dimensional linear subspaces of an quadric of even dimension 2m, one writes  for one of the two connected components.) As a result, the isotropic Grassmannians of a split quadric over a field also have algebraic cell decompositions.

To explain the name: the smallest SO(2m + 1)-equivariant projective embedding of W lands in projective space of dimension . The action of SO(2m + 1) on this projective space does not come from a linear representation of SO(2m+1) over k, but rather from a representation of its simply connected double cover, the spin group Spin(2m + 1) over k. This is called the spin representation of Spin(2m + 1), of dimension .

Over the complex numbers, the isotropic Grassmannian OGr(r + 1, n + 2) of r-planes in an n-dimensional quadric X is a homogeneous space for the complex algebraic group , and also for its maximal compact subgroup, the compact Lie group SO(n + 2). From the latter point of view, this isotropic Grassmannian is

where U(r+1) is the unitary group. For r = 0, the isotropic Grassmannian is the quadric itself, which can therefore be viewed as

For example, the complex spinor variety OGr(m, 2m + 1) can be viewed as SO(2m + 1)/U(m), and also as SO(2m+2)/U(m+1). These descriptions can be used to compute the cohomology ring (or equivalently the Chow ring) of the spinor variety:

Here  is understood to mean 0 for j > m.

Spinor bundles on quadrics
The spinor bundles play a special role among all vector bundles on a quadric, analogous to the maximal linear subspaces among all subvarieties of a quadric. To describe these bundles, let X be a split quadric of dimension n over a field k. The special orthogonal group SO(n+2) over k acts on X, and therefore so does its double cover, the spin group G = Spin(n+2) over k. In these terms, X is a homogeneous space G/P, where P is a maximal parabolic subgroup of G. The semisimple part of P is the spin group Spin(n), and there is a standard way to extend the spin representations of Spin(n) to representations of P. (There are two spin representations  for n = 2m, each of dimension , and one spin representation V for n = 2m − 1, of dimension .) Then the spinor bundles on the quadric X = G/P are defined as the G-equivariant vector bundles associated to these representations of P. So there are two spinor bundles  of rank  for n = 2m, and one spinor bundle S of rank  for n = 2m − 1. For n even, any reflection in the orthogonal group switches the two spinor bundles on X.

For example, the two spinor bundles on a quadric surface  are the line bundles O(−1,0) and O(0,−1). The spinor bundle on a quadric 3-fold X is the natural rank-2 subbundle on X viewed as the isotropic Grassmannian of 2-planes in a 4-dimensional symplectic vector space.

To indicate the significance of the spinor bundles: Mikhail Kapranov showed that the bounded derived category of coherent sheaves on a split quadric X over a field k has a full exceptional collection involving the spinor bundles, along with the "obvious" line bundles O(j) restricted from projective space:

if n is even, and

if n is odd. Concretely, this implies the split case of Richard Swan's calculation
of the Grothendieck group of algebraic vector bundles on a smooth quadric; it is the free abelian group

for n even, and

for n odd.

Notes

References
 
 
 
 
 
 
 

 
Algebraic geometry
Projective geometry
Algebraic homogeneous spaces